Korgun District is a district of the Çankırı Province of Turkey. Its seat is the town of Korgun. Its area is 378 km2, and its population is 4,569 (2021).

Composition
There is one municipality in Korgun District:
 Korgun

There are 12 villages in Korgun District:

 Alpsarı 
 Buğay 
 Çukurören 
 Dikenli 
 Hıcıp
 İkiçam 
 Ildızım 
 Karatekin 
 Kayıçivi
 Kesecik 
 Maruf 
 Şıhlar

References

Districts of Çankırı Province